Proposition 27 was a California ballot proposition on the general election on November 8, 2022 that would have legalized online and mobile sports betting platforms that are associated with an existing gaming tribe.

Proposition 27 was most notable for its large amount of advertising spending and very large margin of defeat, its 83.05% against to 16.95% in favor marks it as one of the largest margins of defeat for any proposition in history. With both Proposition 27 and the similar Proposition 26 failing, sports betting remains illegal in California.

Background

Contents
The proposition will appear on the ballot as follows:

Support and opposition

Polling

See also
 List of California ballot propositions

References

External links

2022 California ballot propositions